NGC 228 is a spiral galaxy located in the constellation Andromeda. It was discovered on October 10, 1879 by Édouard Stephan.

References

External links
 

0228
Barred spiral galaxies
Andromeda (constellation)
Discoveries by Édouard Stephan
002563